"This World" is a song performed by Belgian musician and songwriter Selah Sue from her self-titled debut album Selah Sue. It was released on 9 May 2011 in Belgium.

Track listing

Credits and personnel
Lead vocals – Selah Sue
Producers – Patrice
Lyrics – Sanne Putseys, Pieter Jan Seaux, Louis Favre, Joachim Saerens
Label: Because Music
Bass - Pieter Jan Seaux

Chart performance

Weekly charts

Year-end charts

Certifications

Release history

References

2011 singles
Selah Sue songs
2010 songs
Songs written by Selah Sue
Because Music singles